Charles Max Schrimpf (May 31, 1890 – January 22, 1932) was an American politician and businessman.

Schrimpf was born in Milwaukee, Wisconsin. He went to the public schools and was a farmer, clerk, and cigar manufacturer. Schrimpf and his wife lived in Appleton, Wisconsin. Schrimpf served in the Wisconsin Assembly from 1923 to 1925 and was a Republican. He died suddenly from a heart attack at his home in Appleton, Wisconsin.

Notes

External links

1890 births
1932 deaths
Politicians from Milwaukee
Politicians from Appleton, Wisconsin
Businesspeople from Wisconsin
Farmers from Wisconsin
Cigar makers
Republican Party members of the Wisconsin State Assembly
20th-century American politicians
20th-century American businesspeople